Sébastien Auguste Baussan (24 May 1829, Avignon – 23 February 1907, Montpellier) was a French sculptor.

Life 
Originally from Avignon, Auguste Baussan was trained by his father Joseph Baussan (1791–1871), himself a sculptor, and by the painter Charles Matet in Montpellier. Baussan actively participated in the Montpellier artistic milieu of the second half of the 19th century with Matet, Michel Maximilien Leenhardt, Édouard-Antoine Marsal and Frédéric Bazille. He subsequently taught as professor of sculpture at the Montpellier École des Beaux-Arts.

Works 

 Agde:
 Place de la Belle Agathoise: Agathé, or La Belle Agathoise (1858).
 Promenade: Monument à Claude Terrisse (1875).
 Alès:
 Jardin du Bosquet: Monument à Louis Pasteur (1896).
 Béziers:
 Cimetière Vieux: Monument funéraire de Fortuné Singla (1876).
 Lodève:
 Cimetière: Monument funéraire de Georges Fabre (1882).
 Montpellier:
 Centre hospitalier Saint-Éloi:
 Monument à Combal (1894).
 Monument à Dubrueil (1894).
 Monument à Jacques-Mathieu Delpech (1898).
 Cimetière protestant:
 Monument funéraire d'Ernest Audibert (1902).
 Monument funéraire de Frédéric Bazille.
 Cimetière Saint-Lazare:
 Monument funéraire de Polge (1904).
 Monument funéraire de Joseph et Auguste Baussan (1906).
 Église Saint-Roch: Statue de Saint Roch (1894).
 Square Planchon: Monument à Jules Émile Planchon (1893).
 Université de Montpellier: Buste d'Armand Sabatier (1905).

References

Citations

Bibliography 

 Oliver, Valerie Cassel, ed. (2011). "Baussan, Sébastien Auguste". In Benezit Dictionary of Artists. Oxford Art Online.

1829 births
1907 deaths
19th-century French sculptors